Brush Strokes Image Editor 1.01 is a bitmap graphics editor made by Paul Bird for Microsoft Windows. It is released as freeware.

Features

 GIF animations
 filters (e.g. blur, sharpen, negative, outline, posterize)
 transformations (e.g. rotation, perspective, twist)
 colour adjustment
 selections (e.g. magic wand, colour selections)
 paint tools (e.g. pen, brush, clone tool)
 pattern and image fills
 transparency
 feathering
 crop

The "Filters & Lenses" tool box has a noise reduction function that retains edges within the canvas. It can significantly reduce or eliminate speckles and smudging in JPEG images. Any of the filters can be applied repeatedly for two seconds by clicking on the last button in the tool box. The first row of buttons in the tool box apply the current pen color as a semi-transparent gradient superimposed on the canvas:

 Top to bottom
 Right to left
 Bottom to top
 Left to right

The "Distortions" tool box performs horizontal & vertical flips and rotations. It also contains the "stretch or twist" and "perspective" tools, although they do not perform automatic antialiasing, in the free version of the software.

Note: Right-click the mouse in Brush Strokes to show tooltips. They don't appear automatically.

John Conway's Game of Life simulation

An unusual addition to the "Filters & Lenses" tool box is an implementation of John Horton Conway's Game of Life. It's a simulation of the evolution of cellular automata in which cells replicate or die according to a simple set of rules. The initial pattern of cells constitutes the first generation of automata in the simulation. In Brush Strokes, the pattern of pixels in an image constitute the initial state. Three buttons at the bottom of the "Filters & Lenses" tool box launch a single iteration of the game, modify the image by means of plug-in filters, or trigger the last command repeatedly for two seconds. Any of the filters in the tool box can be applied before proceeding with the game.

Bitmap formats

 BMP
 JPEG
 GIF
 PCX
 TIFF
 TGA
 PNG (import only)
 AVI (import only)

See also
List of raster graphics editors
Comparison of raster graphics editors

External links
Brush Strokes Homepage
Download Version 1.0 at softpedia
Raster graphics editors